The District No. 119 North School is a moveable historic school in Sheridan County, Nebraska, United States that was built in 1951 and served as a school for 10 years.  It is a  building with no foundation, rather resting on skids so that it could be moved to where it was needed.  It was moved to the areas of school-children of ranches too remote for the children come to the school in Ellsworth.  It is now located in Ellsworth.

It was listed on the National Register of Historic Places in 2010.  It was deemed significant as a one-room schoolhouse preserved with good historic integrity.

References

External links 
More photos of the District 119 School at Wikimedia Commons

School buildings on the National Register of Historic Places in Nebraska
One-room schoolhouses in Nebraska
National Register of Historic Places in Sheridan County, Nebraska
Relocated buildings and structures in the United States
School buildings completed in 1951
1951 establishments in Nebraska